The statues of Saints Cyril and Methodius are outdoor sculptures by Karel Dvořák, installed on the north side of the Charles Bridge in Prague, Czech Republic.

External links

 

Christian sculptures
Monuments and memorials in Prague
Sculptures of men in Prague
Statues on the Charles Bridge